Chippewa Valley Regional Airport  is a public use airport in Chippewa County, Wisconsin, United States. The airport is owned by Eau Claire county and is located ) north of the central business district of the city of Eau Claire, Wisconsin.

It is the largest airport in the 30-county northern Wisconsin area and serves primarily the Chippewa Valley region, operating on a budget approved by a commission equally representing the interests of Chippewa, Dunn and Eau Claire counties.

The airport is mainly used for general aviation and business travel; the Eau Claire-based Menards corporation uses CVRA to base their fleet of aircraft to serve their stores throughout the Midwest. It is occasionally used as an alternative landing site for flights bound for Minneapolis-Saint Paul International Airport. As of December 2022, only one commercial airline, Sun Country Airlines, provides service for CVRA to Minneapolis International.

The airport is included in the Federal Aviation Administration (FAA) National Plan of Integrated Airport Systems for 2023–2027, in which it is categorized as a non-hub primary commercial service facility. It is the eighth busiest of eight commercial airports in Wisconsin in terms of passengers served.

History
In 1923,  of land in Putnam Heights were purchased to build an airport. In 1929, Eau Claire Airways was started at the airport, offering training and scheduled taxi service to destinations in Wisconsin and Minnesota.

In 1939, work on a new airport started north of Eau Claire. In 1940, Eau Claire County Airport started operations at its current site. Eau Claire Municipal Airport opened in 1945, while Chippewa Valley Regional Airport was officially opened in 1947 with the arrival of a Northwest Airlines DC-3. At this time, Eau Claire had three airports. Upgrades at Chippewa Valley Regional Airport were made in further decades, with a terminal addition in 1981. Another terminal remodeling and expansion was completed in 2009.

A new $3.9 million  control tower was built in 2005 and opened in November 2006. Passenger loading used to be from the ramp until a jetbridge was installed in Spring 2011.

In 2015, the Airport Commission Room was renamed the Duax Commission Room after long-time airport supporter and former airport commissioner David Duax.

Facilities and aircraft
It has two runways: 4/22 is 8,101 by 150 feet (2,469 x 46 m) with a concrete surface and 14/32 is 5,000 by 100 feet (1,524 x 30 m) with an asphalt/concrete surface.

For the 12-month period ending December 31, 2021, the airport had 19,742 aircraft operations, an average of 54 per day: 82% general aviation, 14% air taxi, 4% military and less than 1% scheduled commercial. In February 2023, there were 88 aircraft based at this airport: 60 single-engine, 10 multi-engine, 15 jet, 2 helicopter and 1 military.

Airline and destinations

Passenger

On behalf of United Airlines, SkyWest operated 1-2 daily flights to Chicago-O'Hare until 2022. On March 10, 2022, SkyWest announced its intention to end its service into EAU. After the announcement, the Wisconsin Department of Transportation began seeking bids for a new carrier to provide service. Three airlines submitted bids to provide service to the regional airport: Boutique Air, Southern Airways Express, and Sun Country Airlines.

After an endorsement from the airport, as well as a recommendation from the airport commission, the United States Department of Transportation selected Sun Country Airlines to provide service to EAU.

Throughout the years, numerous airlines have served Eau Claire including North Central Airlines, Republic Airlines (1979-1986), Lakeland Airlines, Northwest Airlines, Mesaba Airlines, Skyway Airlines, Air Wisconsin, American Central Airlines, Great Lakes Aviation, Big Sky Airlines and Charter Airlines. Allegiant Airlines and Sun Country Airlines often run charter service to popular destinations.

Statistics

Accidents and incidents
On April 11, 2015, a  Quad City Challenger II crashed just south of Eau Claire while operating at the Rosenbaum Field Airport (3WI9). The pilot was fatally injured. The aircraft entered a still dive while in a downwind at 3WI9.

See also
 Eau Claire Transit
 List of airports in Wisconsin
 List of intercity bus stops in Wisconsin

References

Other sources

 Essential Air Service documents (Docket OST-2009-0160) from the U.S. Department of Transportation:
 Order 2012-1-24 (January 26, 2012): tentatively re-selecting SkyWest Airlines, Inc. to provide Essential Air Service (EAS) with subsidy rates as follows: Eau Claire, Wisconsin, $1,733,576; Hancock/Houghton, Michigan, $934,156; Muskegon, Michigan, $1,576,067; and Paducah, Kentucky, $1,710,775.
 Order 2012-2-2 (February 1, 2012): makes final the selection of SkyWest Airlines, Inc., to provide Essential Air Service at Eau Claire, Wisconsin; Hancock/Houghton, Michigan; and Paducah, Kentucky (at Muskegon, the selection of SkyWest was not finalize at this time).
 Order 2013-10-8 (October 21, 2013): reselecting Delta Air Lines, Inc., to provide Essential Air Service (EAS) at Pellston and Sault Ste. Marie, Michigan; and SkyWest Airlines, at Paducah, Kentucky; Hancock/Houghton, and Muskegon, Michigan; and Eau Claire, Wisconsin. The Order also tentatively reselects American Airlines, at Watertown, New York. Eau Claire, Wisconsin: Docket 2009-0306; effective Period: January 1, 2014, through January 31, 2016; Service: Fourteen (14) nonstop round trips per week to Chicago O'Hare (ORD); Aircraft Type: CRJ-200; Annual Subsidy: $1,546,536.

External links
 Chippewa Valley Regional Airport, official website
  page from the Wisconsin DOT Airport Directory
 
 

Airports in Wisconsin
Eau Claire, Wisconsin
Buildings and structures in Chippewa County, Wisconsin
Essential Air Service